The Music Lovers is a 1971 British drama film directed by Ken Russell and starring Richard Chamberlain and Glenda Jackson. The screenplay by Melvyn Bragg, based on Beloved Friend, a collection of personal correspondence edited by Catherine Drinker Bowen and Barbara von Meck, focuses on the life and career of 19th-century Russian composer Pyotr Ilyich Tchaikovsky. It was one of the director's biographical films about classical composers, which include Elgar (1962), Delius: Song of Summer (1968), Mahler (1974) and Lisztomania (1975), made from an often idiosyncratic standpoint.

Plot
Much of the film is without dialogue and the story is presented in flashbacks, nightmares, and fantasy sequences set to Tchaikovsky's music. As a child, the composer sees his mother die horribly, forcibly immersed in scalding water as a supposed cure for cholera, and is haunted by the scene throughout his musical career. Despite his difficulty in establishing his reputation, he attracts Madame Nadezhda von Meck as his patron. His marriage to the allegedly nymphomaniacal Antonina Miliukova is plagued by his homosexual urges and lustful desire for Count Anton Chiluvsky. The dynamics of his life lead to deteriorating mental health and the loss of von Meck's patronage, and he dies of cholera after deliberately drinking contaminated water.

Cast
 Richard Chamberlain as Tchaikovsky
 Glenda Jackson as Nina (Antonina Milyukova)
 Max Adrian as Nikolai Rubinstein
 Christopher Gable as Count Anton Chiluvsky
 Kenneth Colley as Modeste Tchaikovsky
 Izabella Telezynska as Madame Nadezhda von Meck
 Maureen Pryor as Nina's Mother
 Sabina Maydelle as Sasha Tchaikovsky
 Andrew Faulds as Davidov
 Bruce Robinson as Alexei Sofronov
 Ben Aris as Young Lieutenant
 Xavier Russell as Koyola 
 Dennis Myers as Von Meck, twin
 John Myers as Von Meck, twin
 Joanne Brown as Olga Bredska 
 Alexei Jawdokimov as Dmitri Shubelov
 Alex Russell as Von Meck child (as Alexander Russell)
 Clive Cazes as Doctor
 Georgina Parkinson as Odile (SWAN LAKE ballet)
 Alan Dubreuil as Prince in Swan Lake
 Graham Armitage as Prince Balukin
 Ernest Bale as Headwaiter
 Consuela Chapman as Tchaikovsky's Mother 
 James Russell as Bobyek
 Victoria Russell as Tatiana
 Alex Brewer as Young Tchaikovsky

Production

Development
Harry Saltzman had seen some of Russell's television work and wanted to make a film with him. Russell had made many films for television about composers and artists, including Debussy and Richard Strauss, and suggested a biopic of Tchaikovsky, who he had long admired. Saltzman wanted to do something more commercial, leading to Billion Dollar Brain. After that movie Russell tried to get Saltzman to finance the Tchaikovsky film again but the producer declined as Dimitri Tiomkin was making his own Tchaikovsky movie.

Eventually United Artists agreed to finance following the success of Women in Love. Russell later claimed: "if I hadn't told United Artists that it was a story about a homosexual who fell in love with a nymphomaniac it might have never been financed."

The film was originally called Tchaikovsky. It focused on the years 1874–76 which Russell felt were the most crucial in the composer's life.

The script was based on a collection of letters from Tchaikovsky, Beloved Friend, published in 1937.

The title was changed to The Lonely Heart to differentiate it from Tchaikovsky, a Russian film released the previous year. The film's title card eventually reads Ken Russell's Film on Tchaikovsky and The Music Lovers .

Russell said: "The film is about the fact that Tchaikovsky couldn't love anyone even though he wrote some of the world's most beautiful music. He loved himself really and his sister. The film is about how artists transcend personal problems, how he used these problems and their results to create this particular kind of music." The director later added "there's as much tranquility in my film on Tchaikovsky as there is in his music."

"Great heroes are the stuff of myth and legend, not facts," he added. "Music and facts don't mix. Tchaikovsky said: 'My life is in my music.' And who can deny that the man's music is not utterly fantastic? So likewise the movie! I sought to honour his genius by offering up my own small portion of his courage to create."

Casting
Russell offered the two lead roles to actors he worked with on Women in Love, Glenda Jackson and Alan Bates. Both accepted, but Bates then changed his mind. Russell felt this was because Bates "thought it might not be good for his image to play two sexually deviant parts in rapid succession."

United Artists wanted a star to play Tchaikovsky but Russell struggled to find someone who was willing. Eventually someone suggested Richard Chamberlain, who had relocated to the UK. Russell said "When his name was originally put forward I nearly had a heart attack. I'd only seen him as a bland TV doctor." However the director changed his mind after he saw the actor in a TV version of Portrait of a Lady ("I knew we had a contender"). When he discovered that Chamberlain was a skilled piano player, the actor was cast.

Chamberlain called the role "easily the biggest challenge of my career." Russell said Chamberlain "had a certain quiet dignity... which I felt the character needed. He was good to work with, very gentle and sweet; he did everything we asked him."

Production
Jackson said the filmmakers tried to research insane asylums in Russia at the time by asking the Russian embassy "but they told us they were all wonderful so we ended up literally making the film out of the imagination of Ken Russell."

Jackson said "I think people will love it or hate it but I doubt that anyone will go away feeling nothing. I think it's really quite extraordinary." She also said she preferred Women in Love to The Music Lovers "because it had the better script and that makes all the difference."

Rafael Orozco recorded the piano pieces played by Tchaikovsky in the film.

Director Russell hired his wife Shirley as costume designer and cast four of their children –  Alexander, Victoria, James, and Xavier – in small roles.

In one sequence, Tchaikovsky and his patron glimpse each other from a distance as she passes through a wood in her carriage. In real life their paths accidentally crossed in an Italian park. Later, his wife Nina loses her mind and is placed in an insane asylum; in reality she was not institutionalised until after his death.

Glenda Jackson and Andrew Faulds later served together as Labour Party MPs in the British House of Commons from 1992 to 1997, while the screenwriter Melvyn Bragg has been a Labour member of the House of Lords since 1998.

Soundtrack
The London Symphony Orchestra, conducted by André Previn, performs excerpts from the following pieces by Tchaikovsky:

 Piano Concerto in B-flat minor (soloist Rafael Orozco)
 Eugene Onegin (soprano April Cantelo)
 Symphony No. 6 in B minor, Pathétique
 Manfred Symphony
 Romeo and Juliet
 1812 Overture
 Incidental music to Hamlet
 Symphony No. 5 in E minor
 Symphony No. 4 in F minor

Reception
In his review for The New York Times, Vincent Canby stated:

Roger Ebert of the Chicago Sun-Times called it "an involved and garish private fantasy" and "totally irresponsible as a film about, or inspired by, or parallel to, or bearing a vague resemblance to, Tchaikovsky, his life and times."

Time commented: "Seventy-seven years have passed since Tchaikovsky's death. In this epoch of emancipated morality, it would be reasonable to expect that his life would be reviewed with fresh empathy. But no; the same malignant attitudinizing that might have been applied decades ago is still at work . . . [the film's] arch tableaux, its unstable amalgam of life and art, make it a director's picture . . . attempting to reveal psychology through music, Russell makes every character grotesque, every bar of music programmatic."

Variety opined, "By unduly emphasizing the mad and the perverse in their biopic . . . producer-director Ken Russell and scripter Melvyn Bragg lose their audience. The result is a motion picture that is frequently dramatically and visually stunning but more often tedious and grotesque . . . Instead of a Russian tragedy, Russell seems more concerned with haunting the viewers' memory with shocking scenes and images. The opportunity to create a memorable and fluid portrait of the composer has been sacrificed for a musical Grand Guignol."

In the Cleveland Press, Toni Mastroianni said, "The movies have treated composers notoriously badly but few films have been quite so awful as this pseudo-biography of Tchaikovsky."

Dave Kehr of the Chicago Reader described the film as a "Ken Russell fantasia – musical biography as wet dream" and added, "[it] hangs together more successfully than his other similar efforts, thanks largely to a powerhouse performance by Glenda Jackson, one actress who can hold her own against Russell's excess."

TV Guide calls it "a spurious biography of a great composer that is so filled with wretched excesses that one hardly knows where to begin . . . all the attendant surrealistic touches director Ken Russell has added take this out of the realm of plausibility and into the depths of cheap gossip."

Time Out New York calls it "vulgar, excessive, melodramatic and self-indulgent . . . the drama is at fever pitch throughout . . . Chamberlain doesn't quite have the range required in the central role, though his keyboard skills are impressive."

In the London Times, John Russell Taylor wrote of Russell when reviewing this film: "His talent, his sheer zest for film-making are not in doubt. But there is no doubt that his unique gifts are matched at times by a unique talent for misapplying them."

Pauline Kael would later say in an interview: "You really feel you should drive a stake through the heart of the man who made it. I mean it is so vile. It is so horrible."

Home media
The Music Lovers was released to DVD by MGM Home Entertainment on October 12, 2011 via its DVD-on-demand service available through Amazon.

See also
 List of British films of 1971

References

Notes

External links
 The Music Lovers at the Internet Movie Database
The Music Lovers at Trailers from Hell
 

1971 films
1970s biographical drama films
1971 LGBT-related films
British biographical drama films
British LGBT-related films
Films scored by André Previn
Films about classical music and musicians
Films about composers
Films directed by Ken Russell
United Artists films
Cultural depictions of Pyotr Ilyich Tchaikovsky
Films set in the 19th century
1971 drama films
1970s English-language films
1970s British films